Jel or JEL may refer to:

 Jel (rapper), American record producer and rapper
 Jel (singer), Japanese singer
 Journal of Economic Literature